A writer is someone who uses written words to communicate ideas.

Writer may also refer to:

 Writer (album), a 1970 album by Carole King
 LibreOffice Writer, a word processor, forked from OpenOffice.org Writer
 J.R. Writer (born 1984), American hip-hop recording artist
 The Writer, an American monthly magazine for writers
 "The Writer" (song), a 2010 song by Ellie Goulding
 Writers (TV series), a British comedy-drama web and television series
 Stuck in Love, a 2012 film previously titled Writers
 Writer (film), a 2021 Indian Tamil-language film
 Writer, the title of a clerk in the British Royal Navy
 A member of the Society of Writers to Her Majesty's Signet in Scotland

See also
 Write (disambiguation)
 Composer